Mario Milita (June 26, 1923 – August 22, 2017) was an Italian actor and voice actor.

Biography
An actor with a career spanning over 65 years, he became well known to the audiences for his work in animation. Because of his coarse, raspy voice, he was typically known for voicing elderly characters in cartoons, movies and other entertainment. He is most known for being the official Italian voice of Grampa Simpson in The Simpsons from 1991 until his retirement in 2012 (except for the young Abraham, voiced by the official Italian Homer voice, Tonino Accolla) . He has also been the first voice of Herbert from Family Guy and gave his voice for many years to Fred Flintstone.

Since 2004, however, his voice had begun to weaken over time, causing it to become feeble and almost unrecognizable in his last years of activity.

In Italian dubs of live action films, Milita dubbed actors such as Desmond Llewelyn, Ed Williams and Brian Doyle-Murray. He provided the voice of Amos Tupper (portrayed by Tom Bosley) in a few episodes of Murder, She Wrote and Old Man Peabody (portrayed by Will Hare) in Back to the Future.

In 2011, a year before his retirement, he had released an interview.

Retirement and death
After Milita retired in 2012, he passed on the roles of Grampa Simpson and Herbert to Mino Caprio and Valerio Ruggeri respectively and he died on 22 August 2017 at the age of 94, of natural causes.

Filmography

Cinema
Montecassino (1946)
Non ho paura di vivere (1952)
Ultimatum alla vita (1962)

Dubbing roles

Animation
 Grampa Simpson in The Simpsons (seasons 1-22)
 Grampa Simpson in The Simpsons Movie
 Herbert in Family Guy (seasons 1–9)
 Francis Griffin in Family Guy (episodes 2x02, 4x18)
 Fred Flintstone (3rd voice) in The Flintstones
 Fred Flintstone in The Jetsons Meet the Flintstones
 Fred Flintstone in The New Fred and Barney Show
 The Old Heretic in The Hunchback of Notre Dame
 Sparky in Lady and the Tramp II: Scamp's Adventure
 Old Theban in Hercules
 Gennai in Digimon Adventure
 Laughing Bull in Cowboy Bebop
 Mumm-Ra in ThunderCats

Live action
George "Miles" Jergens in Rocky
Mickey Goldmill in Rocky V
Old Man Peabody in Back to the Future
Amos Tupper in Murder, She Wrote (episodes 1x01, 2x07, 2x14, 3x03, 3x06)
Monsignor Fargo in True Confessions
The Ancient One in Santa Claus: The Movie 
Ted Olsen in The Naked Gun 2½: The Smell of Fear
Ted Olsen in Naked Gun : The Final Insult
Q in Moonraker
Q in A View to a Kill
Orderly Turkle in One Flew Over the Cuckoo's Nest
Doc Wallace in The Quick and the Dead
Grandpa Sam in ...And Justice for All
Rabbi Ben Lewis in Keeping the Faith
Frank Slater in Last Action Hero
Man in Airport in Home Alone
Cliff in Home Alone 2: Lost in New York
Ernie in Snow Dogs
Bud Beckett in Philadelphia
Rudolf Smuntz in Mouse Hunt
Priest in Bedazzled
Bradley Tozer in High Road to China
Mr. Finkle in Ace Ventura: Pet Detective
Acme Vice President in Looney Tunes: Back in Action
Abdul Ben Hassan in Blade Runner

Video games
Fakir in Disney's Aladdin in Nasira's Revenge

References

External links
 
 

1923 births
2017 deaths
People from the Province of Latina
Italian male voice actors
Italian male film actors
20th-century Italian male actors
21st-century Italian male actors